Gary Mitchell (born 3 May 1965) is a Northern Irish playwright. By the 2000s, he had become "one of the most talked about voices in European theatre ... whose political thrillers have arguably made him Northern Ireland's greatest playwright".

From a working-class, loyalist background, Mitchell's first foray into writing was for Radio 4. His first play was produced by Tinderbox but Mitchell's first major theatre success was the production (by Connall Morrison) of his In A Little World of Our Own at the Peacock, a gripping and unflinching portrayal of loyalist culture. It won The Irish Times Theatre Award for Best New Play in 1997, and it later went to Belfast as part of an Abbey Theatre tour. The following year the Peacock Theatre produced his As The Beast Sleeps.

He was writer-in-residence at the Royal National Theatre, London in 1999.

His works have also premiered at London's Royal Court Theatre. Force of Change won the Evening Standard Charles Wintour Award (£30,000) for Most Promising Playwright.

He won the prestigious Stewart Parker Award for Independent Voice; other accolades include the George Devine Award.

In November 2005, he was forced out of his home in the Belfast suburb of Rathcoole after it was attacked by loyalist paramilitaries. He and his family had to live in hiding somewhere in Northern Ireland which forced Mitchell to put his career on hold for five years.

He has gone on to win the Aisling Award for Outstanding Achievement in Arts and Culture.

Works
Plays
 Smiley (2016) Lyric Theatre, Belfast
 Demented (2014) Lyric Theatre, Belfast
 Forget Turkey (We liked it so much we're going to Phuket again) (2013) with Dan Gordon and Colin Murphy, Lyric Theatre, Belfast
 Re-energize (2013) Playhouse, Londonderry 
 Forget Turkey (We're going to Phuket this Christmas) (2012) with Dan Gordon and Colin Murphy, Lyric Theatre, Belfast
 Love Matters (2012) Aisling Ghear, Belfast
 Suicide Blonde (2010) Old Red Lion, London
 Remnants of Fear (2005) Dubbeljoint, Belfast
 Loyal Women (2003) Royal Court Downstairs, London
 The Force of Change (2000) Royal Court Upstairs/Downstairs, London
 Marching On (2000) Lyric, Belfast
 Holding Cell (2000) Tinderbox, Belfast
 Energy (1999) Playhouse, Londonderry
 Trust (1999) Royal Court Upstairs, London
 Tearing the Loom (1998) Lyric, Belfast
 As the Beast Sleeps (1998) Peacock, Dublin
 In a Little World of Our Own (1997) Peacock, Dublin
 Sinking (1997) Replay, Belfast
 That Driving Ambition (1995) Replay, Belfast
 Alternative Future (1994) Point Fields, Belfast
 Independent Voice (1993) Tinderbox, Belfast

Radio plays
 Fighting Cowardice (2014) RTÉ Radio 1
 Ulster Volunteers (2014) RTÉ Radio 1
 Loves Worst Day (2013) BBC Radio 4
 Babies (2012) RTÉ Radio 1
 Freedom of Poverty (2011) RTÉ Radio 1
 Ian Really Likes Mary (2010) RTÉ Radio 1
 Echoes of War (2009) BBC Radio 3
 Forgotten People Part Two (2009) RTÉ Radio 1
 Forgotten People Part One (2009) RTÉ Radio 1
 Just 'Cause (2008) RTÉ Radio 1
 Loyal Women (2003) BBC Radio 4
 The Force of Change (2002) BBC Radio 4
 As the Beast Sleeps (2001) BBC Radio 4
 At the Base of the Pyramid (1997) BBC Radio 4
 Drumcree (1996) BBC Radio 4
 Dividing Force Episode Three: Useless Tools (1995) BBC Radio 4
 Dividing Force Episode Two: Raising the Standard (1995) BBC Radio 4
 Dividing Force Episode One: Above the Law (1995) BBC Radio 4
 Stranded (1995) BBC Radio 3
 Mandarin Lime (1995) with Jimmy Murphy BBC Radio 3
 Poison Hearts (1994) BBC Radio 4
 Independent Voice (1993) BBC Radio 4
 A Tearful of Dreams (1993) BBC Radio 4
 The World, the Flesh and the Devil (1991) BBC Radio 4

Television
 Eight Days That Made Rome (episodes) (2017) Channel 5 (UK)

Films
 Suffering (2003) Writer/director
 As the Beast Sleeps (2002) BBC 2
 An Officer From France (1998) RTÉ 1
 Made in Heaven (1996) BBC Education

Awards
Theatre awards
 Aisling Award for Outstanding Achievement in Arts and Culture (2006) Remnants of Fear
 Evening Standard Charles Wintour Award for Most Promising Playwright (2000) The Force of Change
 Joint winner George Divine Award (2000) The Force of Change
 Pearson Best New Play Award (1999) Trust
 Belfast Arts Drama Award (1998) Sinking
 Belfast Arts Drama Award (1998) In a Little World of Our Own
 Irish Times Best New Play Award (1997) In a Little World of Our Own

Film awards
 Belfast Arts Award for Best Film (2002) As the Beast Sleeps
 Best Short Film, Belfast Film Festival (2003) Suffering

See also
List of Northern Irish writers

References

External links
 Profile at Culture Northern Ireland.com Retrieved 23 August 2013
 From Stage To Street – The final edition of this radio series featured Mitchell in Feb. 2011
 "Gary Mitchell asks why plays about Ulster Protestants are so often accused of bias" in The Guardian, 5 April 2003
 Colin Murphy, The John le Carré of Ulster loyalism, Le monde diplomatique, March 2011.

Male dramatists and playwrights from Northern Ireland
1965 births
Living people
Screenwriters from Northern Ireland
Male novelists from Northern Ireland
20th-century novelists from Northern Ireland
21st-century novelists from Northern Ireland
Television writers from Northern Ireland
20th-century British male writers
21st-century British male writers
British male television writers